Antoine Zahra (born 9 January 1981, Żejtun, Malta) is a professional footballer who currently plays for Maltese First Division side Zejtun Corinthians F.C., where he plays as a striker. He is not to be confused with his namesake and conational, an older Antoine Zahra, also a Maltese footballer.

External links
 

1981 births
Living people
Maltese footballers
Malta international footballers
Floriana F.C. players
Hibernians F.C. players
St. George's F.C. players
Association football forwards
People from Żejtun